Pentamine is a pharmaceutical drug that acts as a ganglionic blocker.

References 

Nicotinic antagonists
Quaternary ammonium compounds
Tertiary amines
Ethyleneamines